Davies Ward Phillips & Vineberg LLP is an integrated firm of more than two hundred and forty lawyers, with offices in Toronto, Montreal, and New York City. Davies focuses on business law, including commercial and financial matters. The firm acts for a wide range of industrial and commercial companies and financial institutions, both public and private, domestic and foreign. The firm's Mergers and Acquisitions practice include most industries and service sectors and representation in transactions of every size. Davies consistently ranks in the top 20 by Bloomberg's Global Merger and Acquisitions Advisory rankings.

The 2019 Lexpert®/American Lawyer Guide to the Leading 500 Lawyers in Canada ranks Davies as a leading Canadian firm in corporate transactions (including banking, competition law, corporate/commercial law, corporate finance and securities, corporate tax, and mergers and acquisitions). The Practical Law Company lists Davies as a "Leading" corporate/M&A firm and lists a large number of individual lawyers at Davies as "Endorsed".

References

External links
 Davies Ward Phillips & Vineberg LLP

Law firms established in 1961
Law firms of Canada